Banaszek is a Polish surname. 

Notable people with the surname include:
 Adrian Banaszek (born 1993), Polish cyclist
 Alan Banaszek (born 1997), Polish cyclist
 Anna Dąbrowska-Banaszek (born 1961), Polish doctor, and member of the IX Sejm
 Cas Banaszek (1945–2019), American football offensive lineman
 Jakub Banaszek (born 1991), Polish politician
 Norbert Banaszek (born 1997), Polish cyclist

 Banaszak

Polish-language surnames